Taranis  is a genus of sea snails, marine gastropod mollusks in the family Raphitomidae.

This genus was formerly placed in subfamily Borsoniinae, family Turridae in Vaught (1989).

The name Taranis is the Latinised name of the Gallic thunder god Taran. It is therefore a masculine name.

Description
The species in this genus are characterized by the absence of a radula together with the loss or reduction of a number of other features of foregut anatomy (as described by Kantor & Sysoev (1989) ).

Species
Species within the genus Taranis  include:
 Taranis adenensis Morassi & Bonfitto, 2013
  † Taranis aliena (Marwick, 1965)
 Taranis allo (Lamy, 1934)
 Taranis benthicola (Dell, 1956)
 Taranis borealis Bouchet & Warén, 1980
 † Taranis circumflexa (Hornung, 1920) 
 Taranis columbella Kilburn, 1991
 Taranis granata (Hedley, 1922)
 Taranis gratiosa (Suter, 1908)
 Taranis imporcata (Dell, 1962)
 Taranis inkasa Kilburn, 1991
 Taranis laevisculpta Monterosato, 1880
 Taranis leptalea (Verrill, 1884)
 Taranis mayi (Verco, 1909)
 Taranis miranda Thiele, 1925
 Taranis moerchii (Malm, 1861)
 Taranis nexilis (Hutton, 1885)
 Taranis panope Dall, 1919
 Taranis percarinata Powell, 1967
 Taranis rhytismeis (Melvill, 1910)
 Taranis spirulata (Dell, 1962)
 Taranis tanata Figueira & Absalão, 2010
 Taranis ticaonica Powell, 1967
 Taranis turritispira (Smith E. A., 1882)
Species brought into synonymy
 Taranis aculeata May, 1915: synonym of Nepotilla aculeata (May, 1915)
 Taranis albatrossi Nordsieck, 1971: synonym of Drilliola emendata (Monterosato, 1872)
 Taranis alexandrina Sturany, 1896: synonym of Taranis moerchii (Malm, 1861)
 Taranis amoena G.O. Sars, 1878: synonym of Nepotilla amoena (Sars G. O., 1878)
 Taranis amphitrites Kilburn, 1991: synonym of Taranidaphne amphitrites Morassi & Bonfitto, 2001
 Taranis cirrata (Brugnone, 1862): synonym of Taranis moerchii (Malm, 1861)
 Taranis corneus Okutani, 1966: synonym of Cryptogemma cornea (Okutani, 1966)
 Taranis demersa Tiberi, 1868: synonym of Taranis moerchi (Malm, 1861)
 Taranis emendata Monterosato, 1872: synonym of Drilliola emendata (Monterosato, 1872)
 Taranis japonicus Okutani, 1964: synonym of Cryptogemma japonica (Okutani, 1964)
 Taranis jousseaumei Lamy, 1934: synonym of Taranis allo (Jousseaume, 1934)
 Taranis malmii (Dall, 1889): synonym of Mioawateria malmii (Dall, 1889)
 Taranis microscopica May, 1915: synonym of Nepotilla microscopica (May, 1915) (original combination)
 Taranis moerchi [sic]: synonym of Taranis moerchii (Malm, 1861)
 Taranis monterosatoi Locard, 1897: synonym of Oenopota graphica (Locard, 1897)
 Taranis nezi Okutani, 1964: synonym of Nepotilla nezi (Okutani, 1964)
 Taranis parvulum Locard, 1897: synonym of Taranis borealis Bouchet & Warén, 1980
 Taranis pulchella Verrill, 1880: synonym of Drilliola loprestiana (Calcara, 1841)
 Taranis tholoides Watson, 1882 : synonym of Kryptos tholoides (Watson, 1882)
 Taranis thomsoni Mestayer, 1919: synonym of Taranis nexilis bicarinata (Suter, 1915)
 Taranis tornata Verrill, 1884 : synonym of Taranis moerchi tornata Verrill, 1884
 Taranis zeuxippe Dall, 1919: synonym of Microdrillia zeuxippe (Dall, 1919)

References

 Spencer, H.; Marshall. B. (2009). All Mollusca except Opisthobranchia. In: Gordon, D. (Ed.) (2009). New Zealand Inventory of Biodiversity. Volume One: Kingdom Animalia. 584 pp
 Vaught, K.C. (1989). A classification of the living Mollusca. American Malacologists: Melbourne, FL (USA). . XII, 195 pp
 Gofas, S.; Le Renard, J.; Bouchet, P. (2001). Mollusca. in: Costello, M.J. et al. (eds), European Register of Marine Species: a check-list of the marine species in Europe and a bibliography of guides to their identification. Patrimoines Naturels. 50: 180-213.
 Liu, J.Y. [Ruiyu] (ed.). (2008). Checklist of marine biota of China seas. China Science Press. 1267 pp.

External links
 
 Jeffreys, J. G. (1870). Norwegian Mollusca. Annals and Magazine of Natural History. (4) 5: 438-448
 Jousseaume F. (1934). Description d'un gastropode nouveau de la Mer Rouge. [Posthumous publication edited by E. Lamy]. Journal de Conchyliologie. 78(1): 67-71
 Finlay H.J. (1926). New shells from New Zealand Tertiary beds: Part 2. Transactions of the New Zealand Institute. 56: 227-258, pls 55-60
 Kilburn, R.N. (1991) Turridae (Mollusca: Gastropoda) of southern Africa and Mozambique. Part 5. Subfamily Taraninae. Annals of the Natal Museum, 32, 325–339
 Worldwide Mollusc Species Data Base: Raphitomidae

 
Raphitomidae
Gastropod genera